Luisa Tisolo (born September 20, 1991) is a Fijian rugby sevens player. She was selected as a member of the Fijian women's national rugby sevens team for the 2016 Summer Olympics in Brazil. She scored Fiji’s first try in the Olympic Games.

References

External links

 

1991 births
Living people
Rugby sevens players at the 2016 Summer Olympics
Olympic rugby sevens players of Fiji
Fiji international rugby sevens players
Fijian female rugby union players
Fiji international women's rugby sevens players